Alexandra Tower is a residential tower located in the Prince's Dock area of Liverpool, England. It was constructed between 2005 and 2008 and upon completion became the sixth tallest building in Liverpool.

In March 2010, a  decorative glass panel shattered and fell from the building onto the ground below. The cause is not known, although it is thought that temperature fluctuations caused by overnight freezing and subsequent heating during the day may have been responsible. To date only some safety scaffolding remains in place to catch any falling debris.

Following the issues with the glazing, the developer Millenium Estates Ltd went into administration and was taken over by Zolfo Cooper (Alix Partners). The building was deemed unsafe and was applied with a Section 77 (dangerous buildings act) due to the issues with nickel sulphide inclusions in some of the glass. 

In 2015, the building was acquired by Colin Wright in a company called Mersey Investments ltd. (IOM).  Colin who is a Dubai based developer (of Macintyre Asset Management / Macintyre Group) acquired the building and proceeded to resolve the glazing issues, removed the Section 77 and completed the unfinished works inside the building.

Gallery

References

External links
 Millennium Estates homepage
 AFL Architects homepage

Buildings and structures in Liverpool
Alexandra Tower